Östergötland County or Region Östergötland held a regional council election on 9 September 2018, on the same day as the general and municipal elections.

Results
The number of seats remained at 101 with the Social Democrats winning the most at 31, a drop of six from 2014.

Municipalities
The Moderates received one vote more than the Social Democrats in Söderköping, even though both results were rounded to 22.2%.

Images

References

Elections in Östergötland County
Östergötland